The Young Magician is a Canadian-Polish children's drama film, directed by Waldemar Dziki and released in 1987. The fourth film in the Tales for All series of children's films, the film centres on Peter Meller (Rusty Jedwab), a young boy who is initially treated as an outcast when he discovers that he possesses the ability to telekinetically move objects with his mind, but becomes a hero when his power is the only thing that can save his city from a military attack.

Although the film was shot in Poland with a Polish cast of actors, and then dubbed into English and French for Canadian distribution, its setting was portrayed as Canada. Nicholas Read of the Vancouver Sun criticized this as a narrative contrivance, noting that the dialogue and costume design did not feel natural to a contemporary Canadian setting.

The film received three Genie Award nominations at the 9th Genie Awards in 1988, for Best Overall Sound (Michel Charron, Jo Caron, André Gagnon, Michel Descombes), Best Sound Editing (Viateur Paiement, Serge Viau, Alain Clavier, Claude Langlois, Louise Coté) and Best Original Song (Howard Forman and Krzesimir Dębski for "When We're Together").

Cast 

 Rusty Jedwab as Piotr Meller
 Eduard Garson as Aleksander 
 Daria Trafankowska 
 Mariusz Benoit 
 Władysław Kowalski 
 Natasza Maraszek as Małgosia
 Tomasz Klimasiewicz as Michał
 Jan Machulski 
 Maria Robaszkiewicz 
 Maciej Szary 
 Danuta Kowalska 
 Grażyna Szapołowska 
 Andrzej Szczepkowski 
 Andrzej Blumenfeld 
 Wojciech Asiński 
 Ewa Biała 
 Zbigniew Bielski 
 Jan Hencz 
 Piotr Krukowski 
 Wojciech Mann 
 Bogusława Pawelec  
 Piotr Polk 
 Zbigniew Suszyński 
 Michał Szewczyk 
 Zdzisław Szostak

References

External links
 

1987 films
1980s children's drama films
Canadian children's drama films
Polish children's films
1987 drama films
Polish drama films
1980s Canadian films